USS Minnetonka was one of eight wooden steam frigates authorized by the United States Navy during the American Civil War to provide a postwar general purpose fleet.

She was launched on 3 July 1867 by the Portsmouth Navy Yard, Kittery, Maine; and sponsored by Miss Margaret Bailey. Renamed USS California on 15 May 1869, she first went to sea on 7 October 1870, and served briefly in the Pacific. However, because she had been constructed of partially seasoned timber due to an unprecedented volume of shipbuilding during the war, her hull deteriorated rapidly and she was sold at Mare Island Navy Yard in May 1875.

See also
List of sloops of war of the United States Navy

References
 

Steamships of the United States Navy
Ships built in Kittery, Maine
1867 ships